Group C of the 1998 Fed Cup Europe/Africa Zone Group I was one of four pools in the Europe/Africa Zone Group I of the 1998 Fed Cup. Four teams competed in a round robin competition, with the top two teams advancing to the knockout stage.

South Africa vs. Latvia

Romania vs. Bulgaria

South Africa vs. Bulgaria

Romania vs. Latvia

South Africa vs. Romania

Latvia vs. Bulgaria

See also
Fed Cup structure

References

External links
 Fed Cup website

1998 Fed Cup Europe/Africa Zone